What Am I Without You is a 1934 German musical comedy film directed by Arthur Maria Rabenalt and starring Wolfgang Liebeneiner, Betty Bird, and Olga Chekhova.

The film's sets were designed by the art directors Gustav A. Knauer, Alexander Mügge and Walter Reimann. It was shot at the Johannisthal Studios in Berlin.

Cast

References

External links

1934 musical comedy films
German musical comedy films
Films of Nazi Germany
Films directed by Arthur Maria Rabenalt
German black-and-white films
Tobis Film films
Films shot at Johannisthal Studios
1930s German films